Hugo Viana (born September 26, 1982) is a Brazilian mixed martial artist. A professional MMA competitor since 2010, Viana made a name for himself competing on the first season of Globo's The Ultimate Fighter: Brazil. He formerly competed for the Ultimate Fighting Championship (UFC), fighting in its bantamweight division.

Mixed martial arts career
Viana decided to begin training in mixed martial arts in 2010 after admiring the sport for several years and having trained in Tae Kwon Do since he was 12 years old and in Boxing and Wing Chun since age of 21. In 2005, he took up Brazilian jiu-jitsu before he began his MMA training with Champions Team MMA in his hometown of Salvador, Bahia, Brazil. Wolverine (nicknamed after the Marvel Comics character) did not spend long on the amateur circuit, only competing in one fight before turning professional only a few months later.

He made his professional debut on May 26, 2010 against Marcelo Santos at a Win Fight and Entertainment event. Hugo won the fight via unanimous decision after three rounds. He fought on the next Win Fight card in August 2010 against Marcelo Palombo de Souza, winning the fight via split decision. From November 2010 to September 2011 Hugo fought three times, winning all three fights via unanimous decision to bring his record to 5-0. He tried out for a spot on the first installment of The Ultimate Fighter: Brazil and was selected.

The Ultimate Fighter
In March 2012, it was revealed that Wolverine was selected to be a participant on The Ultimate Fighter: Brazil. He defeated Alexandre Ramos via TKO in the first round to move into the Ultimate Fighter house, and become an official cast member.

Viana was selected as the second pick (fourth overall) by Vitor Belfort, to be a part of Team Vitor. In the first round of the tournament, Hugo was selected to fight Marcos Vina of Team Wanderlei. After two close rounds, Wolverine was announced the winner via unanimous decision.

In the semi-finals, Hugo fought Rony Mariano Bezerra, losing the fight via unanimous decision, thus eliminating him from the tournament.

Ultimate Fighting Championship
Viana made his UFC debut on June 23, 2012 at UFC 147 against John Teixeira. The fight was contested at a catchweight of 150 lbs. after Teixeira missed weight. He won the fight via split decision (29-28, 28-29, 29-28).

Viana dropped down to the Bantamweight division for his next fight on December 15, 2012 at The Ultimate Fighter 16 Finale against Reuben Duran. He won the fight via KO in the first round.

Viana was expected to face Francisco Rivera on April 20, 2013 at UFC on Fox 7.  However, Rivera was forced out of the bout with an injury and replaced by T.J. Dillashaw. He lost the fight via TKO in the first round.

Viana was expected to face Johnny Bedford on September 4, 2013 at UFC Fight Night 28.  However, Bedford pulled out of the bout citing an injury and was replaced by Wilson Reis. However, just days before the event, Viana was forced out of the bout with an injury, removing their fight from the card altogether.

Viana faced Junior Hernandez at UFC on Fox 10. He won the fight via unanimous decision.

Viana faced Aljamain Sterling on July 16, 2014 at UFC Fight Night 45. He lost the fight via TKO in the third round.

Viana faced Guido Cannetti on August 1, 2015 at UFC 190. He lost the fight by unanimous decision and was subsequently released from the promotion.

Mixed martial arts record

|-
|Loss
|align=center|8–4
|Zac Riley
|Decision (unanimous)
|RFA 34: Velickovic vs. Smith
|
|align=center|3
|align=center|5:00
|Broomfield, Colorado, United States
|
|-
|Loss
|align=center|8–3
|Guido Cannetti
|Decision (unanimous)
|UFC 190
|
|align=center|3
|align=center|5:00
|Rio de Janeiro, Brazil
|
|-
|Loss
|align=center|8–2
|Aljamain Sterling
|TKO (punches)
|UFC Fight Night: Cowboy vs. Miller
|
|align=center|3
|align=center|3:50
|Atlantic City, New Jersey, United States
|
|-
|Win
|align=center|8–1
|Junior Hernandez
|Decision (unanimous)
|UFC on Fox: Henderson vs. Thomson
|
|align=center|3
|align=center|5:00
|Chicago, Illinois, United States
|
|-
|Loss
|align=center|7–1
|T.J. Dillashaw
|TKO (punches)
|UFC on Fox: Henderson vs. Melendez
|
|align=center|1
|align=center|4:22
|San Jose, California, United States
|
|-
|Win
|align=center|7–0
|Reuben Duran
|KO (punch)
|The Ultimate Fighter: Team Carwin vs. Team Nelson Finale
|
|align=center|1
|align=center|4:05
|Las Vegas, Nevada, United States
|
|-
|Win
|align=center|6–0
|John Macapá
|Decision (split)
|UFC 147
|
|align=center|3
|align=center|5:00
|Belo Horizonte, Brazil
|
|-
|Win
|align=center|5–0
|Thiago Nascimento
|Decision (unanimous)
|Win Fight and Entertainment 10
|
|align=center|3
|align=center|5:00
|Salvador, Brazil
|
|-
|Win
|align=center|4–0
|Rafael Sobral
|Decision (unanimous)
|Win Fight and Entertainment 9
|
|align=center|3
|align=center|5:00
|Salvador, Brazil
|
|-
|Win
|align=center|3–0
|Dingo Sampaio
|Decision (unanimous)
|Demo Fight 5
|
|align=center|3
|align=center|5:00
|Salvador, Brazil
|
|-
|Win
|align=center|2–0
|Marcelo Palombo 
|Decision (split)
|Win Fight and Entertainment 7
|
|align=center|3
|align=center|5:00
|Salvador, Brazil
|
|-
|Win
|align=center|1–0
|Marcelo Santos
|Decision (unanimous)
|Win Fight and Entertainment 6
|
|align=center|3
|align=center|5:00
|Salvador, Brazil
|
|}

Mixed martial arts exhibition record

|-
|Loss
|align=center|2-1
|Rony Jason
|Decision (unanimous)
|The Ultimate Fighter: Brazil
| (airdate)
|align=center|3
|align=center|5:00
|São Paulo, Brazil
|
|-
|Win
|align=center|2-0
|Marcos Vinicius
|Decision (unanimous)
|The Ultimate Fighter: Brazil
| (airdate)
|align=center|2
|align=center|5:00
|São Paulo, Brazil
|
|-
|Win
|align=center|1-0
|Alexandre Ramos
|TKO (punches)
|The Ultimate Fighter: Brazil
| (airdate)
|align=center|1
|align=center|0:00
|São Paulo, Brazil
|
|-

See also
 List of current UFC fighters
 List of male mixed martial artists

References

External links
 
 

1982 births
Brazilian male mixed martial artists
Living people
Brazilian male taekwondo practitioners
Brazilian Wing Chun practitioners
Brazilian practitioners of Brazilian jiu-jitsu
Bantamweight mixed martial artists
Mixed martial artists utilizing taekwondo
Mixed martial artists utilizing Wing Chun
Mixed martial artists utilizing boxing
Mixed martial artists utilizing Brazilian jiu-jitsu
Sportspeople from Salvador, Bahia
Ultimate Fighting Championship male fighters